Kawanda–Birembo High Voltage Power Line is a high voltage electricity power line, under construction, connecting the high voltage substation at Kawanda, in Uganda to another high voltage substation at Birembo, in Rwanda.

Location

Overview
This power transmission line connects the electricity grid of Uganda to that of neighboring Rwanda. It is in line with the Nile Equatorial Lakes Subsidiary Action Program, Interconnection of Electric Grids Project, led by Regional Manager, Grania Rubomboras. The power line is being developed in tandem with Karuma Hydroelectric Power Station, whose capacity output of 600MW is expected to be consumed locally and the balance sold regionally, with Rwanda, Burundi and the Democratic Republic of the Congo as potential customers.

Construction in Uganda
The project on the Uganda side is divided into three sections:

The Kawanda–Masaka section was constructed at a budgeted cost of US$153.20 million, of which the World Bank lent US$120 million. Completion was expected in January 2019. However, in July 2018, the Daily Monitor reported that the 220kV line had been commissioned.

The Masaka–Mbarara section was budgeted at €50 million, to be borrowed from the European Union Africa Infrastructure Fund. Work is expected to start in the fourth quarter of 2017 and is expected to conclude in 2019. In March 2018, The Uganda Independent reported that the Ugandan government borrowed €37.1 million from the French Development Agency and another €35 million from the German Development Bank to finance the Masaka-Mbarara section of this transmission line.

The Mbarara–Mirama Hills section was completed in 2015.

Construction in Rwanda
As reported by the EastAfrican in May 2015, this 220kV network already exists. Rwanda is also in the process of building a 220kV substation in Birembo.

Recent developments
At a later date, the entire Kawanda–Birembo High Voltage Power Line is expected to be upgraded to 400kV. In November 2020, the New Vision newspaper reported that the German Development Bank (KfW) had
partially co-funded the upgrade of the Masaka–Masaka section to 400kV.

See also
Energy in Uganda
Energy in Rwanda

References

External links
Website of the Uganda Electricity Transmission Company Limited
Website of Rwanda Energy Group Limited
 Power imports to increase supply, support industries in Rwanda

High-voltage transmission lines in Uganda
High-voltage transmission lines in Rwanda
Energy infrastructure in Africa
Energy in Uganda
Energy in Rwanda